Chroniochilus is a genus of flowering plants from the orchid family, Orchidaceae. It contains 5 species, native to Yunnan, Thailand, Malaysia and Indonesia.

Taxonomy

Species
 C. ecalcaratus (Holttum) Garay - Pahang, Sabah
 C. minimus (Blume) J.J.Sm. - Borneo, Java, Malaysia
 C. sinicus  L.J.Chen & Z.J.Liu - Yunnan
 C. thrixspermoides (Schltr.) Garay  - Sumatra
 C. virescens (Ridl.) Holttum - Thailand, Borneo, Sumatra, Malaysia

Description

Generative characteristics 
Chroniochilus produces small flowers on racemose inflorescences. The conical, fleshy, mobile labellum does not bear a spur. The androecium consists of two pollinia.
In Chroniochilus sinicus, flowering occurs from August to October.

Etymology 
The generic name Chroniochilus is derived from the Greek chronios, meaning lasting or persistent, and cheilos, meaning lip.

Conservation 
It has been recommended to categorize Chroniochilus sinicus as endangered (EN) according to the IUCN Red List criteria.

References 

Vandeae genera
Aeridinae